Robert Allan Edgar (born 1940) is an inactive Senior United States district judge of the United States District Court for the Eastern District of Tennessee.

Education and career
Born in Munising, Michigan, Edgar received a Bachelor of Arts degree from Davidson College in 1962 and a Bachelor of Laws from Duke University School of Law in 1965. He was in the United States Army from 1965 to 1967 and became a captain. While in the army, he served in intelligence and security services in Vietnam during the Vietnam War September 1966 to March 1967. He was in private practice in Chattanooga, Tennessee from 1967 to 1985. He was a representative in the Tennessee State Legislature from 1970 to 1972.

Federal judicial service
On February 26, 1985, Edgar was nominated by President Ronald Reagan to a seat on the United States District Court for the Eastern District of Tennessee vacated by Judge Herbert Theodore Milburn. Edgar was confirmed by the United States Senate on April 15, 1985, and received his commission on April 16, 1985. He served as Chief Judge from 1998 to 2005, assuming senior status on October 7, 2005. He took inactive senior status on June 30, 2016, meaning that while he remains a federal judge, he no longer hears cases or participates in the business of the court.

References

Sources

1940 births
Living people
Davidson College alumni
Duke University School of Law alumni
Judges of the United States District Court for the Eastern District of Tennessee
People from Munising, Michigan
United States Army officers
United States Army personnel of the Vietnam War
United States district court judges appointed by Ronald Reagan
20th-century American judges
21st-century American judges